SET (Suppressor of variegation, Enhancer of Zeste, Trithorax) and MYND (myeloid-Nervy-DEAF-1) domain-containing protein 3 is a protein that in humans is encoded by the SMYD3 gene.

Function 

SMYD3 is a lysine methyltransferase which specifically methylates H3K4 and H4K5.  SMYD3 plays a role in transcriptional regulation as a member of an RNA polymerase complex. It is also involved in cancer regulation.

Expression 
SMYD3 is predominantly expressed in skeletal muscles and the testis.

Model organisms 

Model organisms have been used in the study of SMYD3 function. A conditional knockout mouse line, called Smyd3tm2a(KOMP)Wtsi was generated as part of the International Knockout Mouse Consortium program — a high-throughput mutagenesis project to generate and distribute animal models of disease to interested scientists — at the Wellcome Trust Sanger Institute.

Male and female animals underwent a standardized phenotypic screen to determine the effects of deletion. Twenty three tests were carried out on homozygous mutant adult mice, however no significant abnormalities were observed.

Interactions 

SMYD3 has been shown to interact with Heat shock protein 90kDa alpha (cytosolic), member A1 and POLR2A.

SMYD3 trimethylates a lysine residue on MAP3K2, which causes crosstalk into the MAP kinase signaling pathway in Ras-driven cancers.

Link to cancer 
SMYD3 plays an important role in the progression of cancers in humans. It is highly over expressed in a number of cancers such as liver, breast, and colorectal carcinomas. SMYD3 is known to play a role in lung, esophageal and prostate cancers also.

It has been noted that in lung and colorectal cancers, MAP3K2 methylation by SMYD3 ameliorates PPA2's inhibitory control, which leads to the overriding of apoptosis signals via the activation of the MEK/ERK signalling cascade.  Meanwhile, in colon and liver cancers, SMYD3-mediated methylation of H3 promotes RNAP II recruitment and the associated transcription factors from proto-oncogenic regions.

References

Further reading 

 
 
 
 
 
 

Genes mutated in mice